Khudian Khas, is a large town and Municipal Committee of Kasur District in the Punjab province of Pakistan..Khudian is part of Kasur Tehsil and is at an altitude of 177 meters (583 feet) above sea level. The Sutlej River, which flows on the India-Pakistan border, is 20 kilometers from Khudian. It is 33 kilometers from India-Pakistan border of Ganda Singh Wala.

Etymology 
Khudian Khas (55030) is a historical town with a history of over 500 years. It is believed that Raja Todar Mal, finance minister of the Mughal Empire during Akbar's reign, established this town, similar to the nearby town Chunian, though little historical evidence of this belief has been documented.

At that time, this place was located at the cross-section of dirt roads leading to Kasur, Depalpur, Ferozpur and Multan. Due to this central location, Pashtun and Mughal soldiers have made depositories - called "Khuddi" in their terminology - for stockpiling hay and pasture grass for their horses and animals. Nearby, a fort was built as a resting point for these soldiers. With the passage of time, this place became known as "Khudian".

Boundary 
At the time of establishment of Pakistan in 1947, this town had a population of four thousand people.

The town had four gates which were closed at night for security reasons. These gates were called: Kasuri Gate, Kalay Khan Gate, Chunian Gate and Mahtama Wala Gate. Its existing boundaries are Kasur-Pakptan Road, Katora Branch Canal and Canal Colony. This canal was built in the colonial times and starts at Head Balloki and ends at Head Sulemanki.

A mud castle was still existent in 1947 on the banks of Katora Branch Canal (also called Jora Canal) but got demolished with the passage of time.

Roads and Highways 
Due to the central location of the town, residents could easily travel all around the region. In the first half of 20th century, primary means of transportation were horses, ponies and bull-carts. Post office was established in the town in year 1834 and horses and ponies were used for delivery of posts.

It is also mentioned that Sardar Muhammad Hussain of Qila Ganja Kasur. M.L.A. arranged a public meeting addressed by the founder of Pakistan, Mr. Muhammad Ali Jinnah in 1929 in the area of Khudian.

After 1947, Khudian became part of Tehsil Chunian. For traveling to Chunian, a transport called Okara-Lahore Transport Service started daily bus service, which used to commence its travel from Chunian Gate of the town at early morning and return on the same bus in the evening.

In 1951, Sardar Abdul Rab Nishtar, then Governor of West Punjab Province, inaugurated the paved Kasur-Khudian-Depalpur Road(also known as Multan Delhi Road), which eased the travel for local community. This road still exists as the main transportation connection of the town to the outside world and is commonly known as Depalpur Road.

Existing Kasur-Khudian-Depalpur Road is a dual carriageway, where direct transportation is available for travel to Kasur, Lahore, Depalpur, Pattoki, Multan and Karachi.

A bus service named BUSCO was started which connected Khudian to Kasur and then Kasur to Lahore. Later it was stopped. Nowadays many public buses are available to travel to Kasur or Depalpur.

Railways 

Railway has been another major means of transportation for the town. Khudian Khas is located at Lahore-Pakpatan-Samma Satta (Bahawalpur) Railway Line. Train service on this railway line was started in 1904 during British Raj, but was closed in 1911. After a gap of three years, at the commencement of World War I, train service was restored which continues now.

Before partition, people were able to travel to all parts of British India by connecting through Kasur Junction. It is said that government at that time considered a plan to make Khudian also a junction and lay a railway track to Delhi through Mamdot town of Punjab. However, due to partition, this plan could not be implemented.

Khudian Railway Station was big and well-designed – somewhat similar to the design to existing railway station of Pakpattan. However, in 1971 India-Pakistan War, this station was destroyed and rebuilt in 1972.

More recently, Khudian Khas railway station has been renovated.

Telephone exchange 
The telephone exchange of the town was built in 1979 opposite to the old building of Market Committee. In 1994, a digital exchange was built at a new location on Circular Road, which still continues to operate at the same place.

Electricity 
The town got electricity in 1964 and first connection was given to Masjid Peer Boota. Khudian Khas a 132 KV Grid Station, located on Depalpur Road.

Currently, Lahore Electric Supply Company (LESCO) has its sub-divisions in Khudian Khas, included in Kasur Circle. The detail of these two subdivisions is as following:

LESCO also has a Complaints Office at Khudian Sub-Division.

Population 
Khudian Khas is located in District Kasur. Its Tehsil is also Kasur (District Kasur has four Tehsils namely, Kasur, Chunian, Pattoki and Kot Radha Kishan). As per Census 2017 data from Pakistan Bureau of Statistics, District Kasur had a total population of 3,454,996, with 526,166 households.

Out of this Tehsil Kasur had an urban population of 488,741 individuals with 77,252 households. Rural population of Kasur Tehsil included 845,912 people with 125,692 households.

As per 2017 census, Khudian Khas Municipal Committee had a total population of 38,802 with 6,111 households, with following details:

 Circle No. 1 [Population 14,809; 2,219 households]
 Circle No. 2 [Population 9,788; 1,675 households]
 Circle No. 3 [Population 6,992; 1,116 households]
 Circle No. 4 [Population 7,213; 1,101 households]

Khudian Khas also has a number of villages in its vicinity which are collectively called Khudian QH. The population of Khudian HQ in 2017 was 93,479 individuals with 13,874 households, out of which Khudian Rural has 19,132 people with 3,070 households.

Prominent localities in Khudian QH included: Aulakh Hithar PC, Joian, Chor Kot PC, Heer, Harike Naul PC, Mahmood Pur, Nawan Qila, Qila Ganja, Sahba, Kale PC, Khilch Khalsa, Khai Hithar PC, Baig Pur, Khai Hithar, Rajo Wal Kohna, Sanda Kalan, Khingran Wala PC, Hardo Sahibini Wala, Sangarh, Dhallon, Heemay Wala, Lune Ke, Marali Hithar, Khodey PC, Hardo Muhammad Ke, Khudian Rural PC, Said Pur PC, Sikandar Pur.

Clans 
People from many different clans live in Khudian, including Syeds, Rehmani, Joyia, Bhatti, Khokhar, Mughal, Dogar, Rava Rajputs, Shaikh, Toor, Jandran,Kamboh and Arain.

Education 
Khudian Khas has been a seat of learning for the area since the beginning of 20th century. Currently, town has about 60 education institutions which are offering education from KG to master's degree.

Khudian's oldest seat of learning is Government Higher Secondary School, Khudian. In 1875, a primary school was built in Khudian, which was upgraded to Middle School in 1926. In early 1947, this school was granted the status of High School and Sardar Sujan Singh was appointed its headmaster. After the establishment of Pakistan on 14 August 1947, Shaikh Shahabuddin was appointed school's headmaster. In 1990, school was upgraded to higher secondary status. School is located on a vast area and has dedicated grounds for cricket, football, hockey, basketball and volleyball. In addition, facilities of a science laboratory, library and computer science lab are available in the school.

The Girls High School of Khudian Khas started as a primary school in 1940. In 1954, school was upgraded to middle school, which became the first such facility for girls in the entire area. In 1974, school was further upgraded to High School.

The largest school of the town is Sadiq Memorial High School, which was established in 1993. It has separate primary and high schools for boys and girls.It is a private school and is named after Molama Muhammad Sadiq(Late),who was a respectable personality of the town.

List of colleges 

 Govt. Degree College for Women, Khudian Khas, Kasur
 Government Girls Community College, Khudian Khas
 Concordia College for Boys, Khudian Khas
 Concordia College for Girls, Khudian Khas
 City Science College for Girls, Khudian Khas
 Fast Degree College, Khudian Khas
 Nation College, Khudian Khas

List of Government Schools in Khudian Khas Centre 

  Government Elementary School, Khudian Khas
  Government Elementary School, Marali Hithar
  Government Girls High School, Khudian Khas
  Government Girls Primary School, Himmat Pura
  Government Girls Primary School, Kot Sardar M Hussain
  Government Girls Primary School, Qabar Kot
  Government Girls Primary School, Rahman Abad
  Government Higher Secondary School, Khudian Khas
  Government Primary School, Basti Baghban Pura
  Government Primary School, Basti Eid Gah
  Government Primary School, Canal Colony
  Government Primary School, Dhilam Loonay Key
  Government Primary School, Heemay Wala
  Government Primary School, Himmat Pura
  Government Primary School, Khangran Wala
  Government Primary School, Khokhran Wala
  Government Primary School, Kot Orari
  Government Primary School, Qabar Kot
  Government Primary School, Rahim ud Din

Private Schools in Khudian Khas 

  Abdullah English Medium School Khudian Khas
  Abdullah Public School Khudian Khas
  Ali Grammar School Khudian Khas
  Allied School Herdo Muhammad Kay
  Allied School Khudian Khas
  Azeem Public Girls Elementary School Khudian Khas
  Badar Public School Khudian Khas
  City School of Learning Khudian Khas
  City Science HSS Khudian Khas
  Dar-e-Arqam School Khudian Khas
  Faiz-e-Aam Boys School Khudian Khas
  Faiz-e-Aam Girls School Khudian Khas
  Falahi Model School Khudian Khas
  Fast Muslim Model HSS Khudian Khas
  Glider Science School Khudian Khas
  Hira Public School Heemay Wala
  Hira Public School Khudian Khas
  Jinnah Public H/S Kot Arian Wala
  K. P. S. Boys High School Khudian
  K. P. S. Girls High School Khudian
  Kasur Grammar School Khudian Khas
  Noor Public High School Heemay Wala
  Pakistan Public School Heemay Wala
  Pakistan Public School Khudian Khas
  Qamar School Khudian Khas
  Quaid-e-Azam Motessori School Khudian Khas
  Quaid-e-Azam School Khudian Khas
  Rayyan Grammar School Khudian Khas
  Rehan Montessori School Khudian Khas
  Sadiq Memorial High School for Boys Khudian
  Sadiq Memorial High School for Girls Khudian
  Shan Public School Khudian Khas
  Tameer-e-Millat School Khudian Khas
  Tameer-e-Seerat Khudian Khas
  The Blessing Field School Khudian Khas
  The Education Islamic School Khudian Khas
  The Educators School Khudian Khas
  The Punjab School Khudian Khas
  The School of Legends Khudian Khas
  The Smart School Khudian Khas
  Zainab Memorial School Khudian Khas

Commerce and trade 
Khudian is located between the rivers of Sutlej and Biyas. Historically, frequent flooding in these rivers used to bring nutrients and sediments, which get deposited on flood plains, enriching the soil. This natural fertilization process brought prosperity for the farmers. For this reason, the surrounding area of Khudian became prominent due to its high quality sugar cane fields.

Before the independence of Pakistan in 1947, Khudian was famous for its clay toys and idol making as there was sizeable Hindu population in the town.

Currently, most major crops of Punjab such as wheat, rice, corn and vegetable are grown in the surrounding areas. For fruits, guava is most frequently grown product.

In terms of business and trade, currently, Khudian is the central place of shopping for over a hundred villages around the town, which are spread in about 20 km radius. Therefore, it has flourishing trade and business scene. The town also builds several handicrafts and hand-made products which include: fancy dress making, products made of reeds (willow fencing, mats etc.), embroidery and Mukesh work.

Khudian also has an active wholesale grain market and a wholesale vegetable market. Similarly, as per the provisions of Punjab Agricultural Produce Markets Ordinance 1978, a Market Committee is operating in the town which performs the role of regulating grain and vegetable markets.

There was a major dispute between the Market Committee Khudian and Town Committee Khudian over its control, mainly on the clash in the provisions of Punjab Agricultural Produce Market Ordinance, XXIII of 1978 and the Punjab Local Government Ordinance VI of 1979. The matter went to the High Court, Lahore and later into the Supreme Court. Later Supreme Court of Pakistan made a decision on this case in 1992. The decision was made by then Chief Justice of Pakistan Justice Muhammad Afzal Zullah.

Political leadership 
Khudian became a municipal committee in 1876 in the British colonial time.

Then it was declared a "notified area" between 1913 and 1925. In 1925, Khudian was declared a town committee. Between 1935 and 1947 Sardar Juala Singh was the chairman of the town committee.

After Pakistan's independence, Muhammad Din Rafiq, who was a government employee, was appointed the chairman and Shaikh Muhammad Saeed was appointed the deputy chairman. In 1955, Shaikh Muhammad Saeed became the chairman of the town committee.

In 1973, Khudian was declared a municipal committee but was made a town committee again in 1980.

Based on the local government election of 1980, Shaikh Abdul Majeed became the chairman of the town committee on 16 January 1980. Subsequently, Hafiz Muhammad Idris became the chairman on 18 November 1983. On 20 January 1988, Chaudhary Gulzar Ahamd became the new chairman, but through a no-confidence motion in 1989, Hafiz Muhammad Idris again took charge of the chairman position. Based on 1991 local government elections, Chaudhary Muhammad Aslam became the chairman on 30 January 1992, and after the May 1988 elections, Alhajj Saifullah Zargar and later Mian Ahmad Din became the chairman.

In July 2001, local government elections were held under new system introduced by the new military regime. Based on this election, Sardar Muhammd Nawaz became the chairman on 14 August 2001. 

In December 2016, according to allegations, through heavy bribery, Haji Muhammad Ibrahim Jalal became the chairman and Sardar Jawad Ibrahim Dogar became the deputy chairman of the town committee As in February 2021, a government appointed administrator is in-charge of Town Committee as local government elections have not been held for many years.

As per government records of 2019, Town Committee Khudian has 84 employees.

Police station 
Khudian Police Station was established in 1879 which covers about 80 villages.

Medical facilities 
Khudian has government-run Rural Health Center, located in Bhaghbanpura area. It has an area of 4 acres of land and was established in August 1985. Prior to that, a Government Dispensary was working near to old Town Committee office. This health facility is open 24/7 and includes basic facilities such as outdoor patient department, X-ray, dental unit, laboratory, operation theatre, along with an ambulance. The town also an EPI vaccination centre for the children.

Khudian also has a Civil Veterinary Hospital in Himmat Pura area which offers a range of services includes treatment and vaccination.

Khudian also has over 10 private hospitals which include, among others: Javed Hospital, Khursheed Mukhtar Memorial Hospital, Aslam Hospital, Ali Hospital, Liaqat Medical Centre, Yaseen Medical Centre, Tayyab Shaheed Hospital, Buraq Baloch Hospital, Khawaja Ahad Hospital.

Al Rahman Welfare Foundation is running Alfalah Free Dispensary in the town since December 2013, which offers basic health check-up by a qualified doctor and medicines, absolutely free of charge. Alfalah Free Dispensary has provided free medical facility to over 170,000 patients in first seven years of its operation i.e. between 2013- 2020.

Post office 
Khudian Post Office was established in 1834. Its post code is 55030. In addition to regular postal and Postal Saving Bank services, this post office works agent location Western Union.

In addition, several courier companies have their offices in the town such as TCS, Leopards, SkyNet and others.

NADRA office 
The National Database & Registration Authority (NADRA) has its office in Khudian Khas which offers national registration facilities such as issuance of National ID Cad (CNIC), Smart Cards, Child Registration Certificate, Family Registration Certificate etc.

Canal Colony 
Khudian Khas has a Canal Colony on the outskirts of the town, which was established in the colonial times. It is a land area of several acres and has a beautiful rest house.

A degree college for girls is now built in the Canal Colony, named Govt Degree College for Women.

Notable Personalities 
•Molana Sadiq (Late)
•Kifyat Ullah Mufti Advocate, Kasur
•Khalid Saif Ullah SDO (Retired)
•Dr. Muhammad Ali
•Professor Haji Muhammad Dogar
•Rizwan Saif Ullah Medical Technologist
•Usman Abdullah Executive Engineer
•Badar Ahsan Ullah CSP/CSS Officer
•Lt Col (r) Muhammad Afzal Shakir
•Dr Muhammad Ali
•Sheikh Riaz Ahmad(Late)
•Sheikh Muhammad Arshad
•Haji Barkat Ali Khalid
•Sheikh Muhammad Siddique
•Sheikh Muhammad Ahmad Ali
•Mr Khalid Mehmood
•Mr Arshad Salik
•Mr Abid Jamal
•Mr Muhammad Ibrahim
•Dr Ali
•Dr Javed
and many more

References

Populated places in Kasur District